The Piano Concerto No. 5 in D major, Op. 120 "Concerto Pastorale", by Ferdinand Ries was composed between 1813-1816 and published in 1823 by the firm of Sauer & Leidesdorf with a dedication to Prince Oscar of Sweden.

Composition history

According to Allen Bradley in the liner notes to the Naxos recording, the composers manuscript is undated making it difficult to determine exactly at what point the composer started working on this concerto. However the works dedication to Prince Oscar of Sweden, suggests that he started work on the concerto during his time in Sweden and worked intermittently on it, along with revisions to the Piano Concerto Op.55 until around 1815-16. This would make the concerto the sixth of the composers eight piano concertos to be written. The concertos publication in 1823 came at a time when Ries was retiring from active performing and so no longer needed to keep secret the works he relied on in performance.

Structure

The concerto follows the traditional three-movement structure:

 Allegro
 Andantino
 Rondo: Allegro

Recordings

To date the concerto has only been recorded once, by Uwe Grodd with the Bournemouth Symphony Orchestra and soloist Christopher Hinterhuber, this was released by Naxos Records in conjunction with a publication of the score in a critical edition prepared by Allen Bradley.

References
Notes

Sources

External links
 

05
1816 compositions
Compositions in D major
Music dedicated to nobility or royalty